Plumalecium is a monotypic genus of cnidarians belonging to the monotypic family Plumaleciidae. The only species is Plumalecium plumularioides.

The species is found in Northern America.

References

Plumularioidea
Hydrozoan genera
Monotypic cnidarian genera